Dune: Spice Wars is a 4X real-time strategy video game developed by Shiro Games and published by Funcom. In the game, the player tries to dominate the planet of Arrakis diplomatically or militarily. The title is set in the Dune universe, it was released in early access in April 2022 and is set for a full release in 2023.

Gameplay 

Dune: Spice Wars is a 4X real-time strategy game set on the desert planet of Arrakis. Certain tiles have resources like spice and minerals, and unique tiles such as the polar ice caps can produce large amounts of water for the player. The deep desert serves the same purpose as oceans do in other titles, being impassible by troops unless you have certain research done. Spice Wars has five factions: House Atreides, House Harkonnen, House Corrino, The Smugglers and the Fremen. Each Faction is represented by a different leader and has different bonuses. The player can select councilors at the start of the game to give additional bonuses. Once the player recruits agents, they can invest them in different factions and areas of research. For example, putting in agents in Harkonnen might allow to carry out operations against them, while adding agents to Arrakis would allow the player to research sites. Sandworms can pop up around the desert and eat units, a warning is given before it happens. Sietches are found throughout the desert, and can be allied with or destroyed.

The player uses ornithopters in order to scout out the desert and the sites within it. The player can upgrade their main base and the towns they control with different buildings in order to produce resources. Enemy bases are defended by a certain number of troops, and once those are destroyed, the player can lay claim to a village if they have the required authority. The player can research different technologies in the skill tree, ranging from military to economic. The player can only expand and survive if they have enough gold, military power, water and authority to retain control over their dominion. Spice can be used for diplomacy and trade, and in order to retain standing with the Landsraad, the player must pay a tax after a certain number of in-game days. Failing to pay it will reduce the amount of votes available. The Landsraad convenes every couple weeks, and the player can choose what issues are voted on, and whether they or their enemies receive certain buffs or debuts.

Development 
Dune: Spice Wars was released on April 26, 2022, in early access. In June 2022, a patch has been released and roadmap details about future factions and gameplay expansions coming in the near future. Multiplayer and a campaign are planned to be released. A full release is set for 2023. As for the game's art, the lead artist spoke about keeping distance from previous Dune adaptions, "We tried to keep some distance from the previous Dune material out there because we really wanted to have our own take on it and express our own style". The game is mainly based on the books for world inspiration.

Reception 
IGN praised the title's focus on resource management, saying that, "I never fell into a rut in this glimmering desert where I felt like I had enough of everything. Spice Wars always keeps you hungering for something". While enjoying the simplified combat, Rock Paper Shotgun felt that the midgame didn't have much going on, "While the early game is all busy expansion... the mid game plays host to tensionless pockets of ho-hummery". Polygon criticized the lack of narrative in the game, writing, "As of now, it won't be immediately clear to the layperson why the Empire is cracking down on the planet — the game simply starts".

References 

Upcoming video games scheduled for 2023
Early access video games
Real-time strategy video games
Video games based on Dune (franchise)
Video games set on fictional planets
Video games developed in France